The British Academy Television Craft Award for Best Entertainment Craft Team is one of the categories presented by the British Academy of Film and Television Arts (BAFTA) within the British Academy Television Craft Awards, the craft awards were established in 2000 with their own, separate ceremony as a way to spotlight technical achievements, without being overshadowed by the main production categories.

It was first awarded in 2010 as Best Entertainment Production Team but since 2011 it has been awarded under its current name, according to the BAFTA website, the category is "awarded to a creative team working in entertainment programming.", this includes "general entertainment programmes, variety shows, game shows, standup comedies, quizzes, panel games and celebrity chat shows."

Winners and nominees

2010s
Best Entertainment Production Team

Best Entertainment Craft Team

2020s

References

External links
 

Entertainment Craft Team